Hiba may refer to:
 Thujopsis, a genus of conifer in the cypress family

People
 Ibas (Assyrian bishop) (died 457), Syria-born bishop of Edessa (c. 435 – 457)
Hiba Omar, Athlete
Hiba Nawab, Indian television actress
Hiba Abouk (Arabic: هبة أبوخريص بنسليمان),  Spanish actress
Hiba Bukhari, Pakistani television actress
Hiba Tawaji (Arabic: هبة ميشال طوجي ), Lebanese singer